Hyposmocoma pluviella is a species of moth of the family Cosmopterigidae and is endemic to the Hawaiian island of Molokai. It was first described by Lord Walsingham in 1907.

External links

pluviella
Endemic moths of Hawaii
Biota of Molokai
Moths described in 1907
Taxa named by Thomas de Grey, 6th Baron Walsingham